Ornarantia cinctipes is a moth in the family Choreutidae. It was described by Cajetan Felder, Rudolf Felder and Alois Friedrich Rogenhofer in 1875. It is found in Brazil and Central America.

References

Arctiidae genus list at Butterflies and Moths of the World of the Natural History Museum

Choreutidae
Moths described in 1875